Nadir Ali Khan is a Pakistan former professional tennis player.

Nadir is one of four children born to educationalist Zakir Ali Khan. A powerful serve-and-volley player, he was a national champion in singles and won two medals for Pakistan at the 1978 Asian Games, including a singles bronze. He competed for the Pakistan Davis Cup team from 1979 to 1981, winning two singles and one doubles rubber.

References

External links
 
 

Year of birth missing (living people)
Living people
Pakistani male tennis players
Asian Games silver medalists for Pakistan
Asian Games bronze medalists for Pakistan
Asian Games medalists in tennis
Medalists at the 1978 Asian Games
Tennis players at the 1978 Asian Games